Sant'Agata de' Goti is a comune (municipality) and former Catholic bishopric in the Province of Benevento in the Italian region Campania, located about 35 km northeast of Naples and about 25 km west of Benevento near the Monte Taburno.

History 
Sant'Agata is not far from the ancient Samnite town of Saticula.

The 'Goth' part of the town's name does not derive from the (Ostro)Gothic domination of Italy (5th-6th centuries), but from the noble Gascony family De Goth, who held it in the 14th century.

Main sights 
 Cathedral (Duomo), founded in the 10th century, dedicated to the Assumption of Mary. Due to the repeated reconstruction, little remains of the original edifice. The Romanesque crypt shows parts which could belong to several pre-existing buildings, including Roman or earlier ones.
 Church of Santa Menna (10th century).
 Castle, used as Ducal Palace.
 Palace and church of St. Francis (1282).
 Gothic church of the Annunziata (13th century). It houses 15th-century frescoes, and a diptych of the Annunciation dating to the same age.
 The Council Room in City Hall was decorated in 1899 by Vincenzo Severino.

See also 
 List of Catholic dioceses in Italy

References

Sources and external links 
 GCatholic, with Google photo - co-cathedral

Cities and towns in Campania